The 1892 Liège–Bastogne–Liège was the inaugural edition of the Liège–Bastogne–Liège cycle race and was held on 29 May 1892. Léon Houa won the race, which started and finished in Liège.

General classification

References

1892
1892 in Belgian sport